Z Carinae and z Carinae are designations referring to stars in the constellation Carina.

The Bayer designation z Carinae (z Car) is shared by two stars in the constellation Carina:
 HD 96566 (z1 Carinae), the brighter of the pair, often referred to as simply z Carinae
 V371 Carinae (z2 Carinae)
They are separated by 0.53° on the sky.

The variable star designation Z Carinae is used by the star HD 88946, a 10.20m Mira variable.

Carina (constellation)
Carinae, z